The Best of Times is a 1986 American comedy film directed by Roger Spottiswoode, written by Ron Shelton, and starring Robin Williams and Kurt Russell as two friends attempting to relive a high school football game.

Plot 
Jack Dundee is a banker obsessed with what he considers the most shameful moment in his life: dropping a perfectly thrown pass in the final seconds of the 1972 high school football game between Taft and their arch rivals, Bakersfield, which ended in a scoreless tie.

Since that game, Jack has found it impossible to forget this event. He works for his father-in-law, The Colonel, Bakersfield's biggest supporter, who reminds him of the event almost daily.

Thirteen years later Reno Hightower, quarterback of the fateful game, is now a financially struggling van specialist in debt to Jack's bank. His wife Gigi leaves him for the umpteenth time, citing their rut as the reason. She dreams of going to LA to get discovered.

Using an oddly-sounding engine as an excuse to stop by Reno's garage so he can give it a temporary fix, Jack borrows an old car to visit a 'massage expert' on the edge of town. Darla listens while he laments that game, which he is convinced hangs over him like a dark cloud. She suggests he replay the game to be able to move on.

Jack approaches The Colonel and proposes the rematch, and he accepts on Bakersfield's behalf. At home, his wife Elly tries to use emotional blackmail by depriving him of sex to get him to give up his plan to redo the game. It doesn't work, so he moves into the motel.

As Reno is the greatest quarterback in the history of South Kern County and the only QB to wear white shoes, Jack tries to get him on board. At first resistant, he convinces him by helping him with reorganising his late mortgages. Reno and Jack together approach the local Caribou Lodge, who initially also resist the idea.

Disguised as the Bakersfield mascot tiger, Jack goes through town defacing property and landmarks with tiger orange writing taunting messages. At the lodge they incite and convince supporters to re-stage the game.

Jack and Reno's wives invite them to dinner at Jack's on Monday night, under the condition that neither sex nor football comes up. They struggle to find things to talk about, but are managing until Jack gets caught watching the game on TV and gets the men kicked out.

The Taft Rockets are losing 0-26 by end of the first half of the Taft-Bakersfield rematch game, so Jack gets Reno enraged by 'accidentally' letting know it was he who incited the town dressed as the other team's mascot. His meanness returns, spurring the team to little by little catch up. Reno puts Jack back in the game in the last minute.

In the last play of the game, with five seconds left on the clock, Reno throws the ball long to Jack for the winning touchdown. In the process it revitalizes Taft, as well as his and Reno's marriages.

Cast

Production

Filming
Much of the film was shot in and around the actual Taft Union High School. The football scenes took place at Pierce Junior College in the San Fernando Valley. The night game was filmed at Moorpark High School, in Moorpark, CA.

Reception

Critical response
Walter Goodman of the New York Times drew attention to the "constrained" plot and uneven script, but was complimentary of Williams' "amiable performance" and relished the rousing ending which "leaves you with the sort of sappy happy feeling that Frank Capra and Preston Sturges used to provide." In the Los Angeles Times, Michael Wilmington gave special praise to the co-stars, Williams and Russell, whom he described as "maybe the best thing" about the movie and excused the "excesses and flaws" of the script. Calling the film "a lip-smacking tale of all-American wish-fulfillment and a witty satire of its dangers," he commended scenarist Ron Shelton as having "a wickedly tight grip on the absurdities and dynamics of small American cities."

Overall, though, the film has received mixed reviews over the decades since its release, with a 31% approval rating on Rotten Tomatoes based on 13 reviews. Audiences surveyed by CinemaScore gave the film a grade "B+" on scale of A to F.

Pauline Kael called the film "a small town comedy where the whole population is caught up in some glorious foolishness."
Scott Weinberg of eFilmCritic.com wrote: "Forgotten by most yet seemingly adored by those who choose to remember it, The Best of Times stands in my book as one of the truly great sports comedies."

References

External links 
 
 
 

1986 films
1980s sports comedy-drama films
American football films
American sports comedy-drama films
Films directed by Roger Spottiswoode
Films produced by Gordon Carroll
Films set in California
Universal Pictures films
1980s English-language films
1980s American films